Zavojsko  is a historic village in the municipality of Mavrovo and Rostuša, North Macedonia.

History
Due to uprisings in the Upper Reka region, Zavojsko was burned down by Serbian and Bulgarian forces between 1912–1916.

Demographics
In statistics gathered by Vasil Kanchov in 1900, the village of Zavojsko was inhabited by 35 Orthodox Albanians.

References

Sources

Villages in Mavrovo and Rostuša Municipality
Albanian communities in North Macedonia